Jean Courtois (fl. 15301545) was a composer of the Franco-Flemish School of the generation after Josquin des Prez. He was maitre de chapelle to the Archbishop of Cambrai in present-day France. His motet Venite populi terrae was written to celebrate Emperor Charles V and was performed in the Cathedral; the Emperor would have heard it in 1539 on his march to suppress the Revolt of Ghent. He wrote around 20 chansons, 15 motets, and 2 masses. Courtois’ work exhibits the varied imitative procedures and shifting textural treatment which typify the Franco-Netherlandish motet style. The chansons, for 4 voices, are in the "Parisian" style of the day; the works for 5 or 6 voices are in the more contrapuntal "Netherlandish" style.

See also 
 Renaissance music

References

External links 
 
 

Date of birth unknown
Date of death unknown
Classical composers of church music
16th-century Franco-Flemish composers
Renaissance composers
French classical composers
French male classical composers